Gottfried Finger (ca. 1655-6 – buried 31 August 1730), also Godfrey Finger, was a Moravian Baroque composer. He was also a virtuoso on the viol, and many of his compositions were for the instrument. He also wrote operas. Finger was born in Olomouc, modern-day Czech Republic, and worked for the court of James II of England before becoming a freelance composer.  The fact that Finger owned a copy of the musical score of the work Chelys by the Flemish composer Carolus Hacquart suggests that the two composers may have worked together in England.

After a contest in London to set William Congreve's The Judgement of Paris as an opera, in which Finger came in fourth place, he left England and moved to Germany. He died in Mannheim.

External links

Short online biography of Finger.

References

1650s births
1730 deaths
18th-century classical composers
18th-century German composers
18th-century German male musicians
German Baroque composers
German classical composers
German male classical composers
Musicians from Olomouc
Moravian-German people